Liem Soei Liang, also known as Surya Lesmana (20 May 1944 – 8 August 2012) was an Indonesian association football player and manager. Lesmana played midfielder for Persija Jakarta and the Indonesia national team, He also played for Mackinnons in Hong Kong.

Lesmana died of a heart attack on 8 August 2012.

References

External links
 Penghargaan 22 pemain legendaris Indonesia
 Tujuh mantan pemain timnas hidup pas-pasan

1944 births
2012 deaths
Association football midfielders
Indonesian footballers
Indonesia international footballers
Indonesian people of Chinese descent
Indonesian expatriate footballers
Expatriate footballers in Hong Kong
Persija Jakarta players
Mackinnons players
Perserikatan players
Hong Kong First Division League players
People from Tangerang
Indonesian sportspeople of Chinese descent
Sportspeople from Banten